Peter Gildea (1883–1940) was a Scottish professional football outside right who played in the Football League for Bury. He also played in the Scottish League for Airdrieonians and later served Celtic as a scout.

Personal life 
Gildea's brothers Harry and Willie were also footballers.

Career statistics

Honours 

 Cowdenbeath Hall of Fame

References 

Scottish footballers
Lochgelly United F.C. players
Date of birth missing
Scottish Football League players
English Football League players
1883 births
1940 deaths
Footballers from West Lothian
Cowdenbeath F.C. players
Airdrieonians F.C. (1878) players
Bury F.C. players
Association football outside forwards
Celtic F.C. non-playing staff
People from Uphall